Macarena Escudero (born c. 1990) is an activist in the Socialist Workers' Party (Argentina), and a leader of its youth wing.

In 2014 she was elected as a Mendoza city councilor, and in June 2015 she was elected as a Mendoza provincial deputy.

External links 
article on 2015 election
video of her taking her seat in 2014

21st-century Argentine women politicians
21st-century Argentine politicians
Socialist Workers' Party (Argentina) politicians
People from Mendoza, Argentina
1990s births
Living people